Alger Joseph Arbour (November 1, 1932 – August 28, 2015) was a Canadian ice hockey player, coach, and executive. He is third to Joel Quenneville for games coached in National Hockey League history and fifth all-time in wins, behind Scotty Bowman, Joel Quenneville, Ken Hitchcock and Barry Trotz. Under Arbour, the New York Islanders won four consecutive Stanley Cups from 1980 to 1983. Born in Sudbury, Ontario, Arbour played amateur hockey as a defenceman with the Windsor Spitfires of the Ontario Hockey League. He played his first professional games with the Detroit Red Wings in 1953. Claimed by the Chicago Black Hawks in 1958, Arbour would help the team win a championship in 1961. Arbour played with the Toronto Maple Leafs for the next five years, winning another Cup in 1962. He was selected by the St. Louis Blues in their 1967 expansion draft and played his final four seasons with the team.

During his last year with the Blues, Arbour was hired mid-season to coach the team. In 107 games, he led them to a 42–40–25 record, but only one playoff series win. After a woeful expansion season in 1972-73 in which the New York Islanders were coached by Phil Goyette and Earl Ingarfield, the club hired Arbour as its new coach in 1973. Arbour led the team to a winning record every season from 1974–75 until he stepped down in 1985–86. Arbour won nineteen consecutive playoff series, which remains an NHL and North American sports record. He was awarded the Jack Adams Award as the league's top coach in 1979. Upon retiring from the bench, Arbour was named vice-president of player development for the Islanders. He returned to coach the Islanders in the 1988–89 season and remained there through 1993-94, notably upsetting the two-time defending champion Pittsburgh Penguins in the 1993 playoffs. He was awarded the Lester Patrick Trophy for his contributions to the sport and was elected to the Hockey Hall of Fame in 1996.

Playing career

Arbour started his playing career in 1954 with the Detroit Red Wings. He later skated for the Chicago Black Hawks, Toronto Maple Leafs, and St. Louis Blues. Arbour won the Stanley Cup as a player with the 1960–61 Chicago Black Hawks and the 1961–62 and 1963–64 Toronto Maple Leafs. Arbour, along with teammate Ed Litzenberger, is one of eleven players to win consecutive Stanley Cups with two different teams. He is one of only 11 players in Stanley Cup history to win the Cup with three or more different teams. Arbour was also the first captain of the expansion St. Louis Blues, and played for them when they lost in Cup finals in 1968, 1969, 1970 (all in four consecutive games). One of the few professional athletes to wear eyeglasses when competing, Arbour was the last NHL player to wear them on the ice.  Arbour was also known for laying down in front of the goaltender to block shots on goal with his body.

Coaching career
Arbour began his coaching career with the Iowa Hawkeyes hockey team in 1967 and at the time led them in his first year to their best record at .500 then he went to the NHL in St. Louis in 1970, taking over as coach after playing for the Blues for parts of four seasons. Following two additional seasons with St. Louis, he was recruited by GM Bill Torrey to take over a young New York Islanders team that had set a then-NHL record for futility by winning only 12 games in their inaugural season, 1972–73.

New York Islanders (1973–1986)
In his first season as Isles' coach, Arbour's team finished last in the league for the second year in a row, but gave up 100 fewer goals and earned 56 points, up from 30 the year before. New York Rangers defenceman Brad Park said after the Islanders beat their crosstown rivals for the first time, "They have a system. They look like a hockey team."

The 1974–75 Islanders finished third in their division with 88 points, which qualified them for the playoffs for the first time in franchise history. They defeated the Rangers in overtime of the deciding third game of their first-round series. In the next round, the Isles found themselves down three games to none in a best of seven quarter-final series against the Pittsburgh Penguins. The Islanders rebounded with three straight victories to tie the series, then prevailed in Game 7 by a score of 1–0. It was only the second time in major sports history, and the first since 1942, that a team won a series after trailing 3–0. The Islanders then faced the Philadelphia Flyers in the next round, again fell behind 3–0, and once again tied the series, although the Flyers prevailed in Game 7 and went on to win their second consecutive Stanley Cup.

Despite achieving great regular season success, culminating in the 1978–79 campaign in which they finished with the best record in the NHL, the Islanders suffered a series of letdowns in the playoffs. In both 1976 and 1977, they lost in the semi-finals to the eventual champion Montreal Canadiens, and then suffered an upset loss to the Toronto Maple Leafs in the 1978 quarter-finals, on a game-winning goal by Lanny McDonald in overtime of Game 7. Then, in 1979, the rival Rangers defeated Arbour's Islanders in the semi-finals 4–2. Arbour won the Jack Adams Award for the team's stellar regular season.

During the 1979–80 season, the Islanders struggled. However, following the acquisition of Butch Goring in March, the Islanders completed the regular season with a 12-game unbeaten streak. The regular season run carried over to the playoffs and the Islanders captured their first Stanley Cup championship on May 24, 1980, by defeating the Philadelphia Flyers in overtime of Game 6.

Arbour and the Islanders went on to capture 3 more Cups in a row, a record for an American hockey club. Along the way, they set records for consecutive regular season victories, consecutive Finals victories, and playoff series victories. By the time the Islanders were dethroned by the Edmonton Oilers in the 1984 Stanley Cup Finals, they had strung together 19 straight playoff series victories, a professional sports record. No team in any of the four major sports has strung together four consecutive championships since.  The closest a team in any of the major four North American professional sports has come was when the New York Yankees (MLB), who were one out away from their fourth consecutive World Series championship, fell in the seventh game of the series to the Arizona Diamondbacks in 2001.

Arbour retired from coaching following the 1985–86 season and accepted a position in the Islanders front office as vice-president of player development.

Return to coaching (1988–1994)
Following a disappointing start to the 1988–89 season, Torrey fired Terry Simpson, and Arbour returned to the bench. Most of the veterans of the dynasty had since left the team, and the Islanders missed the playoffs for the first time in 14 years. Arbour had one more run deep into the playoffs in 1992–93, where he led the Islanders past the two-time defending champion Pittsburgh Penguins and to the Prince of Wales Conference Finals. Islanders star Pierre Turgeon, who was seriously injured after Dale Hunter hit him from behind in the previous round, missed all but a few shifts of the second-round series against Pittsburgh. The Mario Lemieux-led Penguins had finished first in the regular season. Arbour's Islanders defeated Pittsburgh in overtime of the seventh game of the series. In the semifinals, the Islanders lost to the eventual champion Montreal Canadiens.

Arbour retired after the 1993–94 season, having led the Islanders to a second playoff berth where they were swept in the first round by the Presidents' Trophy-winning New York Rangers, who went on to capture the Stanley Cup. At that time Arbour had won 739 games as an Islander coach, and a banner with that number was raised to the rafters at the Nassau Veterans Memorial Coliseum on January 25, 1997.

Retirement
On November 3, 2007, Arbour returned, at the request of Islanders coach Ted Nolan, to coach his 1,500th game for the Islanders. At age 75, he became the oldest man ever to coach a National Hockey League game. The Islanders beat the Pittsburgh Penguins 3–2, giving Arbour his 740th win. The 739-win banner was brought down, and replaced with one with the number 1500, representing the total number of games coached.  He is the only coach in NHL history to coach 1,500 games for the same team.

Arbour and his wife, Claire, lived in Longboat Key, Florida, and maintained a summer cottage in Sudbury. The couple had four children together. In 2015, he underwent treatment for Parkinson's disease and dementia in Sarasota, Florida, eventually entering hospice care.  Arbour died on August 28, 2015, in Sarasota, Florida, aged 82.

Legacy
 Arbour is a member of the Hockey Hall of Fame, New York Islanders Hall of Fame, and Nassau County Sports Hall of Fame.
 Jack Adams Award as coach in 1979
 Stanley Cup Champion as a player in 1954 (Detroit),  1961 (Chicago), 1962, 1964 (Toronto)
 Stanley Cup Champion as coach in 1980–1983 (head coach for the New York Islanders)
 Calder Cup Champion in 1965, 1966 (with Rochester Americans)

Career statistics

Regular season and playoffs

Coaching record

References

External links
 

1932 births
2015 deaths
Canadian expatriate ice hockey players in the United States
Canadian ice hockey coaches
Canadian ice hockey defencemen
Chicago Blackhawks players
Detroit Hettche players
Detroit Red Wings players
Edmonton Flyers (WHL) players
Hockey Hall of Fame inductees
Ice hockey people from Ontario
Jack Adams Award winners
Lester Patrick Trophy recipients
New York Islanders coaches
Quebec Aces (QSHL) players
Rochester Americans players
Sherbrooke Saints players
Sportspeople from Greater Sudbury
St. Louis Blues coaches
St. Louis Blues players
Stanley Cup champions
Stanley Cup championship-winning head coaches
Toronto Maple Leafs players
Washington Lions players
Windsor Spitfires players